Lakelands may refer to:

Lakelands, New South Wales
Lakelands, Western Australia
Lakelands railway station
Lakelands, Maryland
Lakelands, Nova Scotia (disambiguation), multiple locations
Lakelands Academy, Ellesmere, Shropshire, England
Lakelands (film), an Irish drama film

See also 
Lakeland (disambiguation)